Gökay Güney (born 19 May 1999) is a Turkish professional footballer who plays as a centre-back for the Turkish club Galatasaray in the Süper Lig.

Professional career

Galatasaray
Güney made his professional debut for Galatasaray in a 6-0 Süper Lig win over MKE Ankaragücü on 19 January 2019.

Bandırmaspor (loan)
On 3 August 2021, Bandırmaspor, one of the TFF First League teams, hired Galatasaray's football player, defender Güney, for 1 more year.

International career
Güney is a youth international for Turkey. He represented the Turkey U19s at the 2018 UEFA European Under-19 Championship.

Honours
Galatasaray
 Süper Lig: 2018–19
 Turkish Cup: 2018–19
 Turkish Super Cup: 2016, 2019

References

External links
 
 
 
 
 Galatasaray profile

1999 births
Living people
People from Bakırköy
Footballers from Istanbul
Turkish footballers
Turkey youth international footballers
Galatasaray S.K. footballers
Bandırmaspor footballers
Süper Lig players
Association football defenders
TFF First League players
21st-century Turkish people